The 2019 Independence Bowl was a college football bowl game played on December 26, 2019, with kickoff at 4:00 p.m. EST (3:00 p.m. local CST) on ESPN. It was the 44th edition of the Independence Bowl, and one of the 2019–20 bowl games concluding the 2019 FBS football season. Sponsored by Walk-On's Bistreaux & Bar, the game was officially known as the Walk-On's Independence Bowl.

Teams

The bowl featured the Louisiana Tech Bulldogs of Conference USA (C-USA) against the Miami Hurricanes of the Atlantic Coast Conference (ACC).  It was the fifth meeting between the two programs and their first meeting in a bowl game; Miami had won each of their previous four meetings.

Louisiana Tech Bulldogs

Louisiana Tech entered the bowl with a 9–3 record (6–2 in conference). They were co-champions of the West Division of C-USA; UAB advanced to the C-USA Championship Game due to their regular season win over the Bulldogs. This was Louisiana Tech's fifth Independence Bowl, tying them with Ole Miss for the most appearances in the game. The Bulldogs had a record of 2–1–1 in prior editions of the bowl, most recently with their 2008 team winning that season's Independence Bowl over Northern Illinois, 17–10.

Miami Hurricanes

Miami entered the bowl at 6–6 (4–4 in conference). They finished in a three-way tie for third place in the Coastal Division of the ACC. The Hurricanes started their regular season with two losses, won six of their next eight games, and then finished with two losses. The 2014 Hurricanes appeared in that season's Independence Bowl, losing to South Carolina, 24–21.

Miami was missing several key players for the game, three due to injury and four due to NFL draft considerations.

Game summary

The Bulldogs' win made them the first Group of Five team to shut out a Power Five team in a bowl game in either the Bowl Championship Series (1998–2013) or College Football Playoff (2014–present) era.

Statistics

References

External links

Media Guide
Game statistics at statbroadcast.com

Independence Bowl
Independence Bowl
Independence Bowl
Independence Bowl
Louisiana Tech Bulldogs football bowl games
Miami Hurricanes football bowl games